A unitary authority is a local authority responsible for all local government functions within its area or performing additional functions that elsewhere are usually performed by a higher level of sub-national government or the national government.

Typically unitary authorities cover towns or cities which are large enough to function independently of a council or other authority. An authority can be a unit of a county or combined authority.

Canada
In Canada, each province creates its own system of local government, so terminology varies substantially.

In certain provinces (e.g. Alberta, Nova Scotia) there is only one level of local government in that province, so no special term is used to describe the situation.

British Columbia has only one such municipality, Northern Rockies Regional Municipality, which was established in 2009.

In Ontario the term single-tier municipalities is used, for a similar concept.  Their character varies, and while most function as cities with no upper level of government, some function as counties or regional municipalities with no lower municipal subdivisions below them.  They exist as individual census divisions, as well as separated municipalities.

Central Europe
In Germany, kreisfreie Stadt (literally  circle-free city) is the equivalent term for a city with the competences of both the Gemeinde (municipality) and the Kreis (district, literally circle) administrative level. The directly elected chief executive officer of a kreisfreie Stadt is called Oberbürgermeister (literally Superior Burgomaster, in English "Chief Mayor" or "Lord Mayor").
The British counties have no directly corresponding counterpart in Germany. This German system corresponds to statutory cities in Austria and in the Czech Republic.

Denmark
Until 1 January 2007, the municipalities of Copenhagen, Frederiksberg and Bornholm were not a part of a Danish county.

France
The city of Paris works like a department council and a municipal council. Administratively at state level, it is both a department with a single departmental arrondissement (not to be confused with the 20 city districts of Paris, or arrondissements municipaux, which are local subdivisions existing in very populated municipalities, including Paris, Lyon and Marseille, with their own arrondissement councils and arrondissement mayors also elected during municipal elections), however the prefecture of Paris is split between the prefecture of police of Paris (which covers the 3 other surrounding departments in the first ring) and the department prefecture (which is also the region prefecture, whose competence on police does not cover the 4 departments of Paris and the small ring). As the department of Paris has no department council elected during departmental elections, it is not subdivided into cantons, but its 20 districts are considered equivalent.

The department councils of the two departments of Corsica and of the region merged into a unitary authority, officially a collectivité territoriale. Its area of competence covers the whole administrative region and the two administrative departments (which were kept at state level with their two prefectures and their respective subprefectures for state-managed services).

The overseas departements and regions were all proposed to merge their single departmental council (conseil départemental) coexisting with their regional council (conseil régional) on the same territory (at state level they are unified as DROM for their prefectures) into a collectivité unique. The proposal was rejected by local referendum in Guadeloupe and in Réunion, but this occurred in Martinique and French Guiana whose former departemental and regional councils were merged into a single unitary authority named assemblée, elected during departmental elections. Mayotte with its newer status of department chose to keep this designation for its unitary authority, named departmental council (no regional council was ever created), but which also has the competence of a regional council (plus a few specific competences transferred from the state like other French overseas).

The Métropole de Lyon was created as a metropole from an earlier EPCI (public establishment of intercommunal cooperation) but gained the competences of the departmental council. The departmental council of Rhône only covers the rest of the administrative department (which is still subdivided into two subprefectures, one of which includes the métropole). So the metropole is not a unitary authority, and no longer an EPCI (like other French metropoles), but it has a specific status, considered equivalent to a department council, except that its seats are elected during the municipal French elections (at the same time as its municipal councils in each member commune), and that (like departments and regions, but unlike other French EPCI's including other metropoles) it is a territorial collectivity, with legal personality and fiscal autonomy.

New Zealand
In New Zealand, a unitary authority is a territorial authority (district, city or metropolitan area) that also performs the functions of a regional council (first-level division). There are five unitary authorities, they are (with the year they were constituted): Gisborne District Council (1989), Tasman District Council (1992), Nelson City Council (1992), Marlborough District Council (1992), and Auckland Council (2010).

The Chatham Islands, located east of the South Island, have a council with its own special legislation, constituted (1995) with powers similar to those of a regional authority.

Poland

In Poland, a miasto na prawach powiatu, or shortly powiat grodzki (city with powiat rights, or urban county in short) is a, typically big, city which is also responsible for district (poviat) administrative level, being part of no other powiat (e.g. Kraków, Łódź, Wrocław, Poznań). In total, 65 cities in Poland have this status.

Taiwan
Most cities in Taiwan, in contrast to counties, have only one tier of local government. Unlike the three county-administered cities (Chiayi, Keelung, and Hsinchu), they are independent of their surrounding county. Special municipalities, with the exception of a few mountain indigenous districts within them, are also unitary.

United Kingdom

England

In England, "unitary authorities" are those local authorities set up in accordance with the Local Government Changes for England Regulations 1994 made under powers conferred by the Local Government Act 1992 to form a single tier of local government in specified areas and which are responsible for almost all local government functions within such areas. While outwardly appearing to be similar, single-tier authorities formed using older legislation are not unitary authorities thus excluding e.g. the Council of the Isles of Scilly or any other single-tier authority formed under the older legislation and not since given the status of a unitary authority.

This is distinct from the two-tier system of local government which still exists in most of England, where local government functions are divided between county councils (the upper tier) and district or borough councils. Until 1996 two-tier systems existed in Scotland and Wales, but these have now been replaced by systems based on a single tier of local government with some functions shared between groups of adjacent authorities. A single-tier system has existed in Northern Ireland since 1973.

For many years the description of the number of tiers in UK local government arrangements has routinely ignored any current or previous bodies at the lowest level of authorities elected by the voters within their area such as parish (in England and Wales) or community councils; such bodies do not exist or have not existed in all areas.

Rest of the United Kingdom
The definitive description "unitary authority" is specific to England alone in UK legislation. Thus single-tier authorities elsewhere in the UK are not properly styled as unitary authorities; also their rights, privileges and responsibilities are not the same.

Northern Ireland

Northern Ireland is divided into eleven districts for local government purposes. In Northern Ireland local councils have no responsibility for education, road building or housing (though they do nominate members to the advisory Northern Ireland Housing Council). Their functions include waste and recycling services, leisure and community services, building control and local economic and cultural development. Since their reorganisation in 2015 councils in Northern Ireland have also taken on responsibility for planning functions. The collection of rates is handled by the Land and Property Services agency.

Scotland

Local authorities in Scotland are unitary in nature but not in name. The Local Government etc. (Scotland) Act 1994 created a single tier of local government throughout Scotland. On 1 April 1996, 32 local government areas, each with a council, replaced the previous two-tier structure, which had regional, islands and district councils. Comhairle nan Eilean Siar (formerly the Western Isles Council) uses the alternative Gaelic designation Comhairle. While the phrase "unitary authority" is not used in Scottish legislation (whether from the Scottish Parliament or the UK Parliament), the term can be encountered (used either descriptively or erroneously) in a few official publications and in (usually erroneous) use by United Kingdom government departments.

Wales

Local authorities in Wales are unitary in nature but are described by the Local Government (Wales) Act 1994 as "principal councils", and their areas as principal areas. Various other legislation (e.g. s.91(1) Environment Act 1995) includes the counties and county boroughs of Wales within their individual interpretations of the phrase "unitary authority" as an interpretive not a definitive description. In s.2 of the Act each council formed for a county is allocated the respective English and Welsh descriptions of "County Council" or "Cyngor Sir", each council formed for a County Borough is allocated the respective descriptions of "County Borough Council" or "Cyngor Bwrdeistref Sirol"; in all cases the shorter alternative forms "Council" or "Cyngor" can be used.

United States
There are several types of single-tier governments in the United States. In the states of Connecticut, Rhode Island, and much of Massachusetts, county government has been abolished, and the municipalities (known as New England towns) are the only governing tier below the state government, though the former counties still exist in the ceremonial sense. In some areas, the reverse is true; for example, Howard County, Maryland and Arlington County, Virginia, are examples of counties that, despite being densely developed, have no municipalities and are thus the only tier of general-purpose local government.

In Virginia, all municipalities with city status are, by definition, independent from any county.  Three other cities across the United States are also independent of any county government: Baltimore, Maryland, St. Louis, Missouri, and Carson City, Nevada.  There are also several consolidated cities where the county government and municipal government are unified.  San Francisco and Philadelphia are two examples, wherein the city and county are coterminous and have one singular governing body.

The District of Columbia has had no lower tiers of government since 1871. Arlington County and Alexandria, Virginia, were returned to Virginia in 1847. The District of Columbia Organic Act of 1871 abolished all local governments including single remaining county and its two municipalities, Washington and Georgetown.

See also
 Unitary state

References

Interested parties in planning in the United Kingdom
Local government in Canada
Local government in the United Kingdom
Political systems
Politics of New Zealand
Unitary state